John W. DeGroff (October 12, 1843December 26, 1895) was an American politician, newspaper publisher, and businessman. He was a member of the Wisconsin State Senate and Assembly, representing Buffalo and Trempealeau counties.  As a young man, he also served in the Union Army through most of the American Civil War.

Biography
DeGroff was born on October 12, 1843 in Mentz, New York. He moved to Juneau, Wisconsin in 1848 and to Alma, Wisconsin in 1858. During the American Civil War, DeGroff served in the 25th Wisconsin Volunteer Infantry Regiment of the Union Army. He took part in the Battle of Atlanta and Sherman's March to the Sea.

DeGroff edited the Buffalo County Journal and the Marshfield Times. Additionally, he was a deputy state factory inspector at the time of his death.

DeGroff was elected to the Wisconsin State Assembly in 1879. In 1886, he was elected to the Senate representing the 29th District. He remained a member until 1891. Additionally, he was president of Alma and Clerk of Buffalo County, Wisconsin, as well as chairman of the Buffalo County Board. DeGroff was a Republican.

He died in Buffalo County, Wisconsin, of heart disease on December 26, 1895.

References

People from Cayuga County, New York
People from Juneau, Wisconsin
People from Alma, Wisconsin
Republican Party Wisconsin state senators
Republican Party members of the Wisconsin State Assembly
County clerks in Wisconsin
People of Wisconsin in the American Civil War
Union Army soldiers
Editors of Wisconsin newspapers
1843 births
1895 deaths
19th-century American politicians
Journalists from New York (state)